Guy de Chauliac, also called Guido or Guigo de Cauliaco ( 1300 – 25 July 1368), was a French physician and surgeon who wrote a lengthy and influential treatise on surgery in Latin, titled Chirurgia Magna. It was translated into many other languages (including Middle English) and widely read by physicians in late medieval Europe.

Life
Guy de Chauliac was born in Chaulhac, Lozère, France, into a family of modest means. He began his study of medicine in Toulouse before going to study in Montpellier, the center for medical knowledge in the 14th century of France. He was in Paris between 1315 and 1320, and around 1325, he became a Master of Medicine and Surgery. After receiving his degree, he went to Bologna to study anatomy under Nicola Bertuccio,  from whom he may have learned surgical techniques. It is unknown whether de Chauliac applied his surgical studies and knowledge.  Charles H. Talbot writes, "It was seemingly from books that [Chauliac] learned his surgery.... He may have used the knife when embalming the bodies of dead popes, but he was careful to avoid it on living patients". Others, including Thevenet, claim that Chauliac moved to Mende and then Lyons to practice medicine after learning the art of surgery from Bertuccio.

Chauliac's reputation as a physician grew quickly. He was invited to the Papal Court in Avignon, France, to serve as a personal physician to Pope Clement VI (1342–1352). He went on to become personal physician to Pope Innocent VI (1352–1362), and then to Pope Urban V (1362–1370). He died in Avignon in 1368. He completed his great treatise in 1353.

Life during the Black Death era 
When the Black Death arrived in Avignon in 1348, physicians fled the city. However, Chauliac stayed on, treating plague patients and documenting symptoms meticulously. He claimed to have been himself infected and survived the disease.

Through his observations, Chauliac distinguished between the two forms of the disease, the Bubonic Plague and the Pneumonic Plague. As a precautionary measure, he advised Pope Clement to keep a fire burning continuously in his chamber and to keep visitors out. 

He gave the following description to the papal court:The great death toll began in our case in the month of January [1348], and lasted for the space of seven months. It was of two kinds: the first lasted two months; with continuous fever and spitting of blood; and death occurred within three days. The second lasted for the whole of the remainder of the time, also with continuous fever, and with ulcers and boils in the extremities, principally under the arm-pits and in the groin; and death took place within five days. And [it] was of so great a contagion (especially when there was spitting of blood) that not only through living in the same house but merely through looking, one person caught it from the other.The plague was recognized as being contagious although the agent of contagion was unknown; as treatment, Chauliac recommended air be purified, venesection (bleeding), and healthy diet. The outbreak of plague and widespread death was blamed on Jews, who were heretics, and in some areas were believed to have poisoned wells; Chauliac fought against this idea, using science to declare the theory untrue.

Works

Chirurgia magna

Chauliac's seminal work on surgery, Chirurgia magna,  was finished in 1353 in Avignon, France, just after the bubonic plague. In seven volumes, the treatise covers anatomy, bloodletting, cauterization, drugs, anesthetics, wounds, fractures, ulcers, special diseases, and antidotes. Among de Chaulic's treatments he described the use of oakum, bandages medicated with egg-whites, and many fascinating treatments such as rubbing the scrotum and performing bloodletting to cure a nosebleed. He describes surgical techniques such as intubation, tracheotomy, and suturing, as well as describing the use of anaesthetic gas when performing amputations on patients.

Chauliac quoted frequently from other medical works, written by contemporaries or those written by earlier physicians and anatomists, as he sought to describe the history of medicine. He claimed that surgery began with  Hippocrates and Galen, and was developed in the Arab world by Haly Abbas, Albucasis, and Al-Razi. Through his position as papal physician, Chauliac had access to Galen's texts, recently translated by Niccolò da Reggio from original Greek versions, which were more accurate than the Latin translations.

As well as owing a debt to Galen, Chirurgia magna was greatly influenced by Islamic scientists, and de Chauliac references Avicenna often in the work. The work became popular and was translated into English, French, Dutch, Italian, and Provençal. It was translated into Irish by Cormac Mac Duinnshléibhe. It was reworked multiple times, including to remove references to Islamic scientists, to the point that the work was no longer recognizable as Chauliac's own.

De Chauliac recognized the importance of Montpellier with respect to surgical study.

Emphasis on anatomy
Galen's influence on Chauliac can clearly be seen in the latter's belief that surgeons should have a thorough understanding of anatomy. He wrote, "A surgeon who does not know his anatomy is like a blind man carving a log". He also describes the dissection of a corpse in accordance with Galen's beliefs about the human body. De Chauliac's (and his contemporaries) unwillingness to look outside of textbook knowledge was one of the reasons that Chauliac's anatomical descriptions are not always correct.

Other Works
Three other works were written by Chauliac: Practica astrolabii (De astronomia), an essay on astrology; De ruptura, which describes different types of hernias; and De subtilianti diaeta, describing treatments for cataracts.

References

Sources
Guigo De Caulhiaco (Guy de Chaulliac), Inventarium Sive Chirurgia Magna, Michael R. McVaugh, Margrete S. Ogden (editors), Brill Publishers, 1997. . Reviewed here: 
Guy de Chauliac Biography (c. 1300-c. 1368), 2008. . Reviewed here: 
Ogden, Margaret. (1977). "Review of Guy de Chauliac's Middle English Translation". The Review of English Studies. Vol 28, number 111.
Wallner, Björn. (1995). ”An Interpolated Middle English Version of the Anatomy of Guy de Chauliac. Part 1. Text”, Lund University Press. .

14th-century French physicians
French Roman Catholics
1300s births
1368 deaths
Year of birth uncertain
Papal physicians
14th-century French writers
14th-century Latin writers